Sami El-Sheshini (born 23 January 1972) is an Egyptian former professional footballer who played as a defender.

El-Sheshini spent most of his career playing for Egyptian Premier League side Zamalek SC. He played for the Zamalek side that won the 2000 African Cup Winners' Cup.

El-Sheshini made several appearances for the Egypt national football team, including three appearances at the 1998 African Cup of Nations finals. He also played for Egypt at the 1991 FIFA World Youth Championship in Portugal and the 1992 Summer Olympics in Barcelona.

Managerial statistics

References

External links

1972 births
Living people
Association football defenders
Egyptian footballers
Egypt international footballers
Olympic footballers of Egypt
Footballers at the 1992 Summer Olympics
1998 African Cup of Nations players
Expatriate footballers in Kuwait
Kuwait SC players
Egyptian Premier League players
Pyramids FC managers
Egyptian expatriate footballers
Kuwait Premier League players
Egyptian expatriate sportspeople in Kuwait
Egyptian Premier League managers